Ljosheim Chapel is a chapel of the Church of Norway in Stryn Municipality in Vestland county, Norway. It is located in the village of Mykløy at the southern end of the Oldedalen valley. It is an annex chapel in the Olden parish which is part of the Nordfjord prosti (deanery) in the Diocese of Bjørgvin. The white, concrete chapel was built in 1924 using plans drawn up by the architect Andreas Sande. The chapel seats about 100 people.

History
In 1935, the building was renovated to give it a choir and sacristy so that it could be upgraded to the status of annex chapel. After the renovation the chapel had a long church design. The building was consecrated as a chapel on 22 October 1935. In 1970-1971, the entrance and the sacristy were expanded, and the rooms in the basement were renovated.

See also
List of churches in Bjørgvin

References

Stryn
Churches in Vestland
Long churches in Norway
Concrete churches in Norway
20th-century Church of Norway church buildings
Churches completed in 1924
1924 establishments in Norway